These are the Olympic medalists in men's handball.

References
General

Specific

Handball
Handball
medalists

Olympic